was a Japanese folklorist. He was joined a group under Yanagita Kunio, but often came to different conclusions regarding the same folktales. Along with collecting and compiling folktales, Seki also arranged them into a series of categories.

This work culminated in his Nihon mukashibanashi shūsei (Collection of Japanese Folktales) (1928, revised 1961), in three volumes, which classified Japanese folktales after the model of the Aarne-Thompson system.

A selection was published as Nihon No Mukashi-Banashi (1956–7), and was translated into English as Folktales of Japan (1963) by Robert J. Adams.

University Life 
Seki was a native of Nagasaki Prefecture and graduate of Toyo University. He studied philosophy and worked as a librarian for the university. He founded the Japanese Society for Folk Literature (Nihon Koshobungei Gakkai) in 1977 and was its first president. Seki understood German and translated two works of folktales from German to Japanese, Kaarle Krohn’s Die folkloristische Arbeitsmethode (Folklore Methodology, 1926) and Aarne’s Vergleichende Märchenforschung (Comparative Studies of Folklore, 1908).

Research and Hypotheses 
Keigo Seki's research was on how folklore came to Japan and if some folktales had been imported to Japan from countries such as India and China. Seki's second hypothesis was that folktales should be examined to understand their impact on ordinary events and are to help people in their daily lives. Seki also thought that there was a universal element to folktales and that they are not based on particular ethnic groups.

Major works

Categorization 
In “Types of Japanese Folktales.” Asian Folklore Studies, vol. 25, 1966, Keigo Seki details his own categorization system for folktales, but it did not catch on and the Aarne-Thompson system prevailed. Seki's system had Japanese folktales divided into in the following 18 categories:

 Origin of Animals
 Animal Tales
 Man and Animal
 Escape from Ogre
 Stupid Animals
 Grateful Animals
 Supernatural Wifes and Husbands
 Supernatural Husbands
 Supernatural Wifes
 Supernatural Birth
 Man and Waterspirit
 Magic Objects
 Tales of Fate
 Human Marriage
 Acquisition of Riches
 Conflicts
 Parent and Child
 Brothers (or Sisters)
 Neighbors
 The Clever Man
 Jokes
 Contests
 Osho and Kozo
 Lucky Accidents
 Fools and Numskulls
 Fools
 Blunderers
 Village of Numskulls
 Foolish Son-in-Law
 Foolish Daughter-in-Law
 Formula Tales

References
Citations

Bibliography

1899 births
1990 deaths
Japanese folklorists